Tradition states that Gondar, the capital of the Ethiopian Empire, had 44 Orthodox Tewahedo churches. There are fewer churches in this list – Stuart Munro-Hay provides evidence that shows the number was meant to be taken symbolically, rather than literally – and not all of them are, properly speaking, in Gondar.

References 

 Churches
Ethiopian Orthodox Tewahedo church buildings
Lists of buildings and structures in Ethiopia
 Churches
Lists of churches
Gondarine churches